Leff may refer to:

People

Surname 
 Ari Leff, musician
 Arthur Allen Leff (1935–1981), American professor of law
 Barbara Leff (born 1947), American politician
 Enrique Leff, a Mexican economist
 Harvey S. Leff (born 1937), United States physicist
 Laurel Leff, author
 Michael Leff (1941–2010), U.S. scholar of rhetoric
 Nathaniel Leff, American economist
 Pincus Leff, comedian
 Robert Leff, American businessman
 Zev Leff, Israeli Rabbi

Given name 
 Leff Pouishnoff (1891–1959), Ukrainian-born pianist and composer

Other uses 
 Leff (river), in Brittany, France

See also
 Leffe, a premium beer brand